is a railway station in the city of Tōno, Iwate, Japan, operated by East Japan Railway Company (JR East).

Lines
Kashiwagidaira Station is served by the Kamaishi Line, and is located 31.2 rail kilometers from the terminus of the line at Hanamaki Station.

Station layout
The station has one side platform serving traffic in both directions.  The station is unattended.

History
The station was absorbed into the JR East network upon the privatization of the Japanese National Railways (JNR) on 1 April 1987.

Surrounding area

See also
 List of railway stations in Japan

References

External links

  

Railway stations in Iwate Prefecture
Kamaishi Line
Railway stations in Japan opened in 1915
Tōno, Iwate
Stations of East Japan Railway Company